The Gregorio Luperón High School for Math & Science (in Spanish: Secundaria Gregorio Luperón) is located in District 6 of the borough of Manhattan, New York, United States
The school is named after General Gregorio Luperón, a Dominican president, military general, businessman, liberal politician, freemason, and Statesman who was one of the leaders in the Restoration of the Dominican Republic after the Spanish annexation in 1863.

History
Luperón was founded in 1992 as a transitional program for newly arrived Spanish-speaking immigrants, in 2001 it was converted into a full 4-year diploma-granting high school.  It graduated its first class in 2003.

Course offerings
 Aviation
 ESL
 Spanish
 Math
 Science
 Music
 Robotics
 AP Spanish Language
 AP Spanish Literature
 AP Music
 AP Biology
 AP Calculus
 AP Computer Science, in partnership with TEALS 
 AP Physics

Extracurricular activities
FIRST Robotics Competition
FIRST Tech Challenge
Club A.M.A.S.
Student Council
Newspaper
HIV/AIDS Awareness
Karate
Yoga
Drama Club
Video Production
Baseball Team
 Volleyball Team
 Basketball Team

New building
For more than twelve years, Luperón had problems with overcrowded hallways, faulty air conditioning and heating, and a lack of gym and lab facilities.  Parents and students worked on a campaign to move to a larger space.  After many petitions, protests, and public hearings, they achieved their goal: In 2008, a new edifice was constructed at a cost of $41 million, including not just laboratories and a gymnasium, but a larger library, better internet access, and music and art classrooms.

References

External links

Public high schools in Manhattan
Educational institutions established in 1992
1992 establishments in New York City